Yass Junction railway station is a heritage-listed railway station on the Main South line in New South Wales, Australia. It serves the town of Yass. The station is not in the town itself but is located approximately four kilometres away near the Hume Highway. The station was listed on the New South Wales State Heritage Register on 2 April 1999.

History 
Yass Junction station is located outside of Yass due to the refusal of the Engineer-in-Chief of the New South Wales Railways, John Whitton to build the Main South line through the middle of Yass itself. After a visit on 8 December 1871, to investigate possible routes for the extension of the line from Goulburn, Whitton remarked that "to bring the station to North Yass would increase the length of the line by about three quarters of a mile; that the cost would be considerably more than I had recommended, probably £30,000 or £40,000 for works alone; and that in an engineering point of view [a] divergence to North Yass could not be entertained.

Despite continuous objections, none of Whitton's working plans or other Government surveys were able to find a suitable route for the railway to pass through Yass. Instead, the present route from Gunning to Bowning was chosen which passed four kilometres to the north, with the station opening on 3 July 1876 as Yass.

The Yass Tramway

After a Government Bill was passed "to authorise the construction of tramways along certain streets and highways in the city and suburbs of Sydney and elsewhere", a tramway was built from to Yass Town to convey passengers. The trams departed from a small dock platform behind Platform 2 (the south bound platform). The line opened on 20 April 1892, with Yass station renamed Yass Junction on the same day. On 18 May 1914, the line from Coolalie was duplicated.

It seems that around 1917, some consideration was given to extending the line from Yass to Canberra—as part of a grander plan of extending a railway to Jervis Bay—and this work went as far as determining a proposed route.

Services on the Yass Tramway were suspended on the line on 1 January 1957, started again on 1 December 1957, but again suspended on 18 May 1958. A private bus service continued to carry passengers between the two locations but it also ceased on 18 May 1967. The final services were three steam specials hauled by locomotives 1210 and 3112 on 29 October 1988, before the line was formally closed on 14 November 1988. In 1990, Yass Town station was leased to the Australian Railway Historical Society.

Services 
Yass Junction is served by two daily NSW TrainLink XPT services in each direction operating between Sydney and Melbourne, and a twice weekly NSW TrainLink Xplorer between Griffith and Sydney split from Canberrra services at Goulburn. NSW TrainLink also operate a road coach service from Queanbeyan to Cootamundra via Yass Junction station. This station is a request stop for the evening Melbourne XPT trains, so these services only stop here if passengers have booked to board/alight here.

Heritage listing 
Yass Junction is an important site with the earliest surviving station building on the main southern railway (though altered). The site illustrates the changes from early construction with single track operation to duplication and the need for a second platform with additional facilities including refreshment rooms. These facilities in a remote location indicated concern by the railways to provide a modicum of redress to the citizens of Yass when engineering difficulties meant their town was to be by-passed by the southern railway. The site is significant because of the group of buildings including signal box, footbridge, station buildings and residence.

Yass Junction railway station was listed on the New South Wales State Heritage Register on 2 April 1999 having satisfied the criteria that the place possesses uncommon, rare or endangered aspects of the cultural or natural history of New South Wales. It was assessed as historically, architecturally and socially rare.

References

Attribution

External links

 Yass Junction details Transport for New South Wales

Easy Access railway stations in New South Wales
Railway stations in Australia opened in 1876
Regional railway stations in New South Wales
New South Wales State Heritage Register
Yass, New South Wales
Main Southern railway line, New South Wales